Abdul Waris Khan is an Indian politician and member of 2007 Uttar Pradesh Legislative Assembly representing Thana Bhawan (Assembly constituency). He is affiliated with the Rashtriya Lok Dal (RLD) party.

References 

Year of birth missing (living people)
Living people
Rashtriya Lok Dal politicians
Uttar Pradesh MLAs 2007–2012
Bahujan Samaj Party politicians from Uttar Pradesh